Mamidipally is a village in Rangareddy district in Telangana, India.

Notable People 

 Thiruveer: Indian Film and Stage Actor and Director.

References

Villages in Ranga Reddy district